Hortus Haren is a botanical garden in Haren, Groningen, Netherlands. First created in 1626 by the pharmacist Henricus Munting, it was then situated between Grote Rozenstraat and Grote Kruisstraat in Groningen.  Because of space considerations it relocated to Haren in 1967 and became the largest botanical garden in the country.

Gallery

References

External links

Groningen (city)
Botanical gardens in the Netherlands